African-Americans are an ethnic group in the United States. The first achievements by African-Americans in diverse fields have historically marked footholds, often leading to more widespread cultural change. The shorthand phrase for this is "breaking the color barrier".

One commonly cited example is that of Jackie Robinson, who became the first African-American of the modern era to become a Major League Baseball player in 1947, ending 60 years of segregated Negro leagues.

17th century

1670s

1670 
 First African-American to own land in Boston: Zipporah Potter Atkins

18th century

1730s–1770s

1738 
 First free African-American community: Gracia Real de Santa Teresa de Mose (later named Fort Mose) in Spanish Florida

1746 
 First known African-American (and slave) to compose a work of literature: Lucy Terry with her poem "Bars Fight", composed in 1746 and first published in 1855 in Josiah Holland's "History of Western Massachusetts

1760 
 First known African-American published author: Jupiter Hammon (poem "An Evening Thought: Salvation by Christ with Penitential Cries", published as a broadside)

1767 

 First African-American clockmaker, Peter Hill, was born.

1768 
 First known African-American to be elected to public office: Wentworth Cheswell, town constable in Newmarket, New Hampshire.

1773 
 First known African-American woman to publish a book: Phillis Wheatley (Poems on Various Subjects, Religious and Moral)
 First separate African-American church: Silver Bluff Baptist Church, Aiken County, South Carolina

1775 
 First African-American to join the Freemasons: Prince Hall

1778 
 First African-American U.S. military regiment: the 1st Rhode Island Regiment

1780s–1790s

1783 
 First African-American to formally practice medicine: James Derham, who did not hold an M.D. degree. (See also: 1847)

1785 
 First African-American ordained as a Christian minister in the United States: Rev. Lemuel Haynes. He was ordained in the Congregational Church, which became the United Church of Christ

1792 
 First major African-American Back-to-Africa movement: 3,000 Black Loyalist slaves,  who had escaped to British lines during the American Revolutionary War for the promise of freedom, were relocated to Nova Scotia and given land. Later, 1,200 chose to migrate to West Africa and settle in the new British colony of Settler Town, which is present-day Sierra Leone.

1793 
 First African Methodist Episcopal (AME) Church founded: Mother Bethel A.M.E. Church, Philadelphia, Pennsylvania was founded by Richard Allen

1794 
 First African Episcopal Church established: Absalom Jones founded African Episcopal Church of St. Thomas, Philadelphia, Pennsylvania

19th century

1800s

1804 
 First African-American ordained as an Episcopal priest: Absalom Jones in Philadelphia, Pennsylvania

1807 
 First African-American Presbyterian Church in America: First African Presbyterian Church founded in Philadelphia, Pennsylvania by John Gloucester a former slave.

1810s

1816 
 Richard Allen founded the first fully independent African-American denomination: African Methodist Episcopal Church (AME), based in Philadelphia, Pennsylvania and mid-Atlantic states

1817 
 The First African Baptist Church was the first African-American church west of the Mississippi River. It had its beginnings in 1817 when John Mason Peck and  the former enslaved John Berry Meachum began holding church services for African Americans in St. Louis. Meachum founded the First African Baptist Church in 1827. Although there were ordinances preventing blacks from assembling, the congregation grew from 14 people at its founding to 220 people by 1829. Two hundred of the parishioners were slaves, who could only travel to the church and attend services with the permission of their owners.

1820s

1821 
 First African-American to hold a patent: Thomas L. Jennings, for a dry-cleaning process

1822 
 First African-American captain to sail a whaleship with an all-black crew: Absalom Boston

there were 6 black owners of 7 whaling trips before Absalom Boston's in 1822. Skip Finley Whaling Captains of Color - America's First Meritocracy, US Naval Institute Press, 2019; pg. 47 - 51; pg. 166 - 168

1823 
 First African-American to receive a degree from an American college: Alexander Twilight, Middlebury College (See also: 1836)

1827 
 First African-American owned-and-operated newspaper: Freedom's Journal, founded in New York City by Rev. Peter Williams Jr. and other free blacks.

1830s

1832 
 First governor of African descent in what is now the US: Pío Pico, an Afro-Mexican, was the last governor of Alta California before it was ceded to the US. Like all Californios, Pico automatically became a US citizen in 1848.

1836 
 First African-American elected to serve in a state legislature: Alexander Twilight, Vermont (See also: 1823)
 First African-American to found a town and establish a planned community: Free Frank McWorter (New Philadelphia, Illinois)

1837 
 First formally trained African-American medical doctor: Dr James McCune Smith of New York City, who was educated at the University of Glasgow, Scotland, and returned to practice in New York. (See also: 1783, 1847)

1840s

1845 
 First African-American licensed to practice law: Macon Allen from the Boston bar

1847 
 First African-American to graduate from a U.S. medical school: Dr. David J. Peck (Rush Medical College) (See also: 1783, 1837)
 First African-American president of any nation: Joseph Jenkins Roberts, Liberia

1849 
 First African-American college professor at a predominantly white institution: Charles L. Reason, New York Central College

1850s

1851 
 First African-American member of the Society of Jesus (Jesuits): Patrick Francis Healy (See also: 1866, 1874)

1853 
 First novel published by an African-American: Clotel; or, The President's Daughter, by William Wells Brown, then living in London.

1854 
 First African-American Catholic priest: James Augustine Healy (see 1875 and 1886)
 First institute of higher learning created to educate African-Americans: Ashmun Institute in Pennsylvania, renamed Lincoln University in 1866. (See also firsts in 1863)

1858 
 First published play by an African-American: The Escape; or, A Leap for Freedom by William Wells Brown
 First African-American woman college instructor: Sarah Jane Woodson Early, Wilberforce College
 First African-American woman to graduate from a medical course of study at an American university: Sarah Mapps Douglass
 First African-American Missionary Bishop of Liberia: Francis Burns of Windham, N.Y. of the Methodist Episcopal Church.

1860s

1861 
 First North American military unit with African-American officers: 1st Louisiana Native Guard of the Confederate Army
 First African-American US federal government civil servant: William Cooper Nell

1862 
 First African-American woman to earn a B.A.: Mary Jane Patterson, Oberlin College
 First recognized U.S. Army African-American combat unit: 1st South Carolina Volunteers

1863 
 First college owned and operated by African-Americans: Wilberforce University in Ohio (See also: 1854)
 First African-American president of a college: Bishop Daniel Payne (Wilberforce University)

1864 
 First African-American woman in the United States to earn an M.D.: Dr. Rebecca Lee Crumpler

1865 
 First African-American field officer in the U.S. Army: Martin Delany
 First African-American attorney admitted to the bar of the U.S. Supreme Court: John Stewart Rock
 First African-American to be commissioned as captain in the Regular U.S. Army: Orindatus Simon Bolivar Wall, known as OSB Wall

1866 
 First African-American to earn a Ph.D.: Father Patrick Francis Healy from University of Leuven, Belgium (See also 1851, 1874)
 First African-American woman enlistee in the U.S. Army: Cathay Williams
 First African-American woman to serve as a professor: Sarah Jane Woodson Early; Xenia, Ohio's Wilberforce University hired her to teach Latin and English

1868 
 First elected African-American Lieutenant Governor: Oscar Dunn (Louisiana).
 First African-American mayor: Pierre Caliste Landry, Donaldsonville, Louisiana
 First African-American elected to the U.S. House of Representatives: John Willis Menard. His opponent contested his election, and opposition to his election prevented him from being seated in Congress. (See also: 1870)

1869 
 First African-American U.S. diplomat: Ebenezer Don Carlos Bassett, minister to Haiti
 First African-American woman school principal: Fanny Jackson Coppin (Institute for Colored Youth)
 First African-American to receive a dental degree and become a dentist: Robert Tanner Freeman

1870s

1870 
 First African-American to vote in an election under the 15th Amendment to the United States Constitution, granting voting rights regardless of race: Thomas Mundy Peterson
 First African-American to graduate from Harvard College: Richard Theodore Greener.
 First African-American elected to the U.S. Senate, and first to serve in the U.S. Congress: Hiram Rhodes Revels (R–MS).
 First African-American to serve in the U.S. House of Representatives: Joseph Rainey (R-SC).
 First African-American acting governor: Oscar James Dunn of Louisiana from May until August 9, 1871, when sitting Governor Warmoth was incapacitated and chose to recuperate in Mississippi. (See also: Douglas Wilder, 1990)

1871 
 First African-American page in the United States House of Representatives: Alfred Q. Powell, who was appointed in 1871 by Charles H. Porter (R-VA), with recommendations from William Henry Harrison Stowell (R-VA) and James H. Platt Jr. (R-VA).

1872 
 First African-American midshipman admitted to the United States Naval Academy: John H. Conyers (nominated by Robert B. Elliott of South Carolina).
 First African-American governor (non-elected): P. B. S. Pinchback of Louisiana (See also: Douglas Wilder, 1990)
 First African-American nominee for Vice President of the United States: Frederick Douglass by the Equal Rights Party.

1873 
 First African-American speaker of the Mississippi House of Representatives, and of any state legislature: John R. Lynch

1874 
 First African-American president of a major college/university: Father Patrick Francis Healy, S.J. of Georgetown College. (See also: 1851, 1863, 1866)
 First African-American to preside over the House of Representatives as Speaker pro tempore: Joseph Rainey

1875 
 First African-American Roman Catholic bishop: Bishop James Augustine Healy, of Portland, Maine. (See also: 1854)

1876 
 First African-American to earn a doctorate degree from an American university: Edward Alexander Bouchet (Yale College Ph.D., physics; also first African-American to graduate from Yale, 1874). (See also: 1866)

1877 
 First African-American graduate of West Point and first African-American commissioned officer in the U.S. military: Henry Ossian Flipper.
 First African-American elected to Phi Beta Kappa: George Washington Henderson.

1878 
 First African-American police officer in Boston, Massachusetts: Sergeant Horatio J. Homer.
 First African-American baseball player in organized professional baseball: John W. "Bud" Fowler.

1879 
 First African-American to graduate from a formal nursing school: Mary Eliza Mahoney, Boston, Massachusetts.
 First African-American to play major league baseball: Possibly William Edward White; he played as a substitute in one professional baseball game for the Providence Grays of the National League, on June 21, 1879. Work by the Society for American Baseball Research (SABR) suggests that he may have been the first African-American to play major league baseball, predating the longer careers of Moses Fleetwood Walker and his brother Weldy Walker by five years; and Jackie Robinson by 68 years.

1880s

1880 
 First African-American to command a U.S. ship: Captain Michael Healy.
 First African-American world champion in pedestrianism, a 19th-century forerunner to racewalking and ultramarathons: Frank Hart.

1881 
 First African-American whose signature appeared on U.S. paper currency: Blanche K. Bruce, Register of the Treasury.

1882
 First fully state-supported four-year institution of higher learning for African-Americans: Virginia State University

1883 
 First known African-American woman to graduate from one of the Seven Sisters colleges: Hortense Parker (Mount Holyoke College)
First African-American woman to earn a PhD. Nettie Craig-Asberry June 12, 1883 earns her doctoral degree in music from the University of Kansas one month shy of her 18th birthday.

1884 
 First African-American to play professional baseball at the major-league level: Possibly Moses Fleetwood Walker, but see also William Edward White in 1879. (See also: Jackie Robinson, 1947)
 First African-American woman to hold a patent: Judy W. Reed, for an improved dough kneader, Washington, D.C.
 First African-American to enlist in the U.S. Signal Corps: William Hallett Greene
 First African-American to lead a political party's National Convention: John R. Lynch, Republican National Convention.
 First African-American to deliver a keynote address at a political party's National Convention: John R. Lynch, Republican National Convention.

1886 
 First Roman Catholic priest publicly known at the time to be African-American: Augustine Tolton, Quincy and Chicago, Illinois (See also: 1854)

1890s

1890 
 First African-American woman to earn a dental degree in the United States: Ida Rollins, University of Michigan.
 First African-American to record a best-selling phonograph record: George Washington Johnson, "The Laughing Song" and "The Whistling Coon."
First woman and African-American to earn a military pension for their own military service: Ann Bradford Stokes.

1891 
 First African-American police officer in present-day New York City: Wiley Overton, hired by the Brooklyn Police Department prior to 1898 incorporation of the five boroughs into the City of New York. (See also: Samuel J. Battle, 1911)

1892 
 First African-American to sing at Carnegie Hall: Matilda Sissieretta Joyner Jones
 First African-American named to a College Football All-America Team: William H. Lewis, Harvard University

1895 
 First African-American woman to work for the United States Postal Service: Mary Fields
 First African-American to earn a doctorate degree (Ph.D.) from Harvard University: W.E.B. Du Bois

1898 
 First African-American appointed to serve as U.S. Army Paymaster: Richard R. Wright

1899 
 First African-American to achieve world championship in any sport: Major Taylor, for 1-mile track cycling

20th century

1900s

1901 
 First African-American invited to dine at the White House: Booker T. Washington

1902 
 First African-American professional basketball player: Harry Lew (New England Professional Basketball League) (See also: 1950)
 First African-American professional American football player: Charles Follis
 First African-American boxing champion: Joe Gans, a lightweight (See also: 1908)

1903 
 First Broadway musical written by African-Americans, and the first to star African-Americans: In Dahomey
 First African-American woman to found and become president of a bank: Maggie L. Walker, St. Luke Penny Savings Bank (since 1930 the Consolidated Bank & Trust Company), Richmond, Virginia

1904 
 First Greek-letter fraternal organization founded by African-Americans: Sigma Pi Phi
 First African-American to participate in the Olympic Games, and first to win a medal: George Poage (two bronze medals)

1906 
 First intercollegiate Greek-letter organization founded by African-Americans: Alpha Phi Alpha (ΑΦΑ), at Cornell University
 First academically trained African-American forester: Ralph E. Brock at the Pennsylvania State Forest Academy

1907 
 First African-American Greek Orthodox priest and missionary in America: Very Rev. Fr. Robert Josias Morgan

1908 
 First African-American heavyweight boxing champion: Jack Johnson (See also: 1902)
 First African-American Olympic gold medal winner: John Taylor (track and field medley relay team). (See also: DeHart Hubbard, 1924)
 First intercollegiate Greek-letter sorority established by African-Americans: Alpha Kappa Alpha (ΑΚΑ) at Howard University

1910s

1910 
 First African-American female millionaire: Madam C. J. Walker
 First African-American woman to be recorded commercially: Daisy Tapley

1911 
 First intercollegiate Greek-letter fraternity founded by African-Americans at a historically black college: Omega Psi Phi (ΩΨΦ), at Howard University
 First African-American police officer in New York City: Samuel J. Battle, following the 1898 incorporation of the five boroughs into the City of New York, and the hiring of three African-American officers in the Brooklyn Police Department. Battle was also the NYPD's first African-American sergeant (1926), lieutenant (1935), and parole commissioner (1941). (See also: Wiley Overton, 1891)
 First African-American attorney admitted to the American Bar Association: Butler R. Wilson (June 1911), William Henry Lewis (August 1911), and William R. Morris (October 1911)
 First African-American elected to the Pennsylvania General Assembly: Harry W. Bass (1911).

1914 
 First African-American military pilot: Eugene Jacques Bullard

1915 
 First African-American alderman of Chicago: Oscar Stanton De Priest

1916 
 First African-American to play in a Rose Bowl game: Fritz Pollard, Brown University
 First African-American to become a colonel in the U.S. Army: Charles Young
 First African-American woman to become a licensed pharmacist: Ella P. Stewart

1917 
 First African-American woman to win a major sports title: Lucy Diggs Slowe, American Tennis Association

1919 
 First African-American special agent for the FBI: James Wormley Jones
 First African-American women appointed as police officers: Cora I. Parchment at the New York Police Department (NYPD) and Georgia Ann Robinson, by the Los Angeles Police Department (LAPD)
 First African-American to direct a feature film: Oscar Micheaux (The Homesteader)

1920s

1920 
 First African-American NFL football players: Fritz Pollard (Akron Pros) and Bobby Marshall (Rock Island Independents)
 First African-American bishops of the Methodist Episcopal Church: Robert Elijah Jones and Matthew Wesley Clair.

1921 
 First African-American woman to become an aviation pilot, first American to hold an international pilot license: Bessie Coleman
 First African-American NFL football coach: Fritz Pollard, co-head coach, Akron Pros, while continuing to play running back
 First African-American woman to earn a Ph.D. in the U.S.: Georgiana Rose Simpson, from the University of Chicago in 1921
 First African-American to found a record label: Harry Pace (Black Swan Records)

1923 
 First African-American woman to earn a degree in library science: Virginia Proctor Powell Florence. She earned the degree (Bachelor of Library Science) from what is now part of the University of Pittsburgh.

1924 
 First African-American to win individual Olympic gold medal: DeHart Hubbard (long jump, 1924 Summer Olympics). (See also: John Taylor, 1908)

1925 
 First African-American Foreign Service Officer: Clifton R. Wharton Sr.

1927 
 First African-American to become an officer in the New York Fire Department in New York City: Wesley Augustus Williams.
 First African-American woman to star in a foreign motion picture: Josephine Baker in La Sirène des tropiques.

1928 
 First post-Reconstruction African-American elected to U.S. House of Representatives: Oscar Stanton De Priest (Republican; Illinois)
 First African-American woman to serve in a state legislature: Minnie Buckingham Harper, West Virginia

1929 
 First African-American sportscaster: Sherman "Jocko" Maxwell (WNJR, Newark, New Jersey)

1930s

1931 
 First African-American composer to have their symphony performed by a leading orchestra: William Grant Still, Symphony No. 1, by Rochester Philharmonic Orchestra
 First African-American woman to graduate from Yale Law School: Jane Matilda Bolin

1932 
 First African-American on a presidential ticket in the 20th century: James W. Ford (Communist Party USA, as vice-presidential candidate running with William Z. Foster)
 First African-American Ph.D. in anthropology: William Montague Cobb

1933 
 First African-American woman to earn a doctorate in psychology: Inez Prosser

1934 
 First African-American elected to the U.S. House of Representatives as a Democrat: Arthur W. Mitchell (Illinois)
 First trade union set up for African-American domestic workers by Dora Lee Jones

1936 
 First African-American to conduct a major U.S. orchestra: William Grant Still (Los Angeles Philharmonic)
 First African-American women selected for the Olympic Games: Tidye Pickett and Louise Stokes. Stokes did not compete; Picket competed in the 80-meter hurdles

1937 
 First African-American federal magistrate: William H. Hastie (later the first African-American governor of the United States Virgin Islands)

1938 
 First African-American woman federal agency head: Mary McLeod Bethune (National Youth Administration)
 First African-American woman elected to a state legislature: Crystal Bird Fauset (Pennsylvania General Assembly)

1939 
 First African-American to star in their own television program: Ethel Waters, The Ethel Waters Show, on NBC

1940s

1940 

 First African-American to win an Oscar: Hattie McDaniel (Best Supporting Actress, Gone with the Wind, 1939)
 First African-American to be portrayed on a U.S. postage stamp: Booker T. Washington
 First African-American flag officer: BG Benjamin O. Davis Sr., U.S. Army
 First African-American to earn a doctorate in library science: Eliza Atkins Gleason, from the University of Chicago

1941 
 First African-American to give a White House Command Performance: Josh White

1942 

 First African-American to be awarded the Navy Cross: Doris Miller
 First African-American member of the U.S. Marine Corps: Alfred Masters
 First African-American inadvertently commissioned in the U.S. Navy as a Limited duty Flight instructor:  Oscar Holmes
 First African-American to captain a U.S. Merchant Marine ship, the : Hugh Mulzac

1943 
 Martin A. Martin, first African-American to become a member of the Trial Bureau of the United States Department of Justice, was sworn in on May 31, 1943.
 First African-American woman to earn a Ph.D. in mathematics: Euphemia Haynes, from Catholic University of America

1944 
 First African-American commissioned Line officers in the U.S. Navy: The "Golden Thirteen"
 First African-American commissioned as a U.S. Navy officer from the Naval Reserve Officer Training Corps: Samuel Gravely 
 First female African-American commissioned Navy officers: Harriet Ida Pickens and Frances Wills
 First African-American to receive a contract with a major U.S. opera company: Camilla Williams
 First known African-American comic book artist: Matt Baker in Jumbo Comics #69 for Fiction House
 First African-American reporter to attend a U.S. presidential news conference: Harry McAlpin

1945 
 First African-American member of the New York City Opera: Todd Duncan
 First African-American U.S. Marine Corps officer: Frederick C. Branch
 First African-American was sworn in as a Navy nurse: Phyllis Mae Dailey
 First African-American woman to enter the Coast Guard: Olivia Hooker

1946 
 First African-American to sign a contract with an NFL team in the modern (post-World War II) era: Kenny Washington

1947 
 First African-American Major League Baseball player of the modern era: Jackie Robinson (Brooklyn Dodgers). (See also: William Edward White, 1879; Moses Fleetwood Walker, 1884)
 First African-American Major League Baseball player in the American League: Larry Doby (Cleveland Indians).
 First African-American consensus college All-American basketball player: Don Barksdale
 First comic book produced entirely by African-Americans: All-Negro Comics
 First African-American full-time faculty member at a predominantly white law school: William Robert Ming (University of Chicago Law School)
 First African-American female member of the U.S. House and Senate press galleries: Alice Allison Dunnigan (See also: 1948)

1948 
 First African-American man to receive an Oscar: James Baskett (Honorary Academy Award for his portrayal of "Uncle Remus" in Disney's Song of the South, 1946) (See also: Sidney Poitier, 1964)
 First African-American on an Olympic basketball team and first African-American Olympic gold medal basketball winner: Don Barksdale, in the 1948 Summer Olympics
 First African-American to design and construct a professional golf course: Bill Powell
 First African-American knowingly trained and commissioned as a U.S. Naval aviator: Jesse L. Brown
 First African-American composer to have an opera performed by a major U.S. company: William Grant Still (Troubled Island, New York City Opera)
 First African-American woman to win an Olympic gold medal: Alice Coachman
 First African-American since Reconstruction to enroll at a traditionally white university of the South: Silas Hunt (University of Arkansas Law School)
 First known African-American star of a regularly scheduled network television series: Bob Howard, The Bob Howard Show (See also: 1956)
 First African-American man to graduate from Oregon State College: William Tebeau
 First African-American female reporter to travel with a U.S. president (Harry S. Truman's election campaign): Alice Allison Dunnigan (See also: 1947)

1949 
 First African-American graduate of the U.S. Naval Academy: Wesley Brown
First African-American to chair a committee of the United States Congress: Representative William Dawson (D-IL).
 First African-American to hold the rank of Ambassador of the United States: Edward R. Dudley, ambassador, and previously minister, to Liberia (See also: 1869)
 First African-American to win an MVP award in Major League Baseball: Jackie Robinson (Brooklyn Dodgers, National League) (See also: Elston Howard, 1963)
 First African-American-owned and -operated radio station: WERD, established October 3, 1949 in Atlanta, Georgia by Jesse B. Blayton Sr.
 First African-American woman president of an NAACP chapter nationwide: Florence LeSueur of Boston's NAACP chapter.
 First African-American women to earn a doctor of veterinary medicine degree: Jane Hinton and Alfreda Johnson Webb

1950s

1950 
 First African-American to win a Tony Award: Juanita Hall (Best Featured Actress in a Musical, South Pacific)
 First African-American to win a Pulitzer Prize: Gwendolyn Brooks (book of poetry, Annie Allen, 1949)
 First African-American to win the Nobel Peace Prize: Ralph Bunche
 First African-American to receive a "lifetime" appointment as federal judge: William H. Hastie, U.S. Court of Appeals for the Third Circuit
 First African-American woman to compete on the world tennis tour: Althea Gibson
 First African-American solo singer to have a #1 hit on the Billboard charts: Nat King Cole ("Mona Lisa"), topped "Best Sellers in Stores" chart on July 15 (See also: Mills Brothers, 1943; Count Basie, 1947; Tommy Edwards, 1958; The Platters, 1959)
 First African-American delegate to the United Nations: Edith S. Sampson (See also: 1961)
 First African-American NBA basketball players: Nat "Sweetwater" Clifton (New York Knicks), Chuck Cooper (Boston Celtics), and Earl Lloyd (Washington Capitols). Note: Harold Hunter was the first to sign an NBA contract, signing with the Washington Capitols on April 26, 1950. However, he was cut from the team during training camp and did not play professionally. (See also: 1902)

1951 
 First African-American named to the College Football Hall of Fame: Duke Slater, University of Iowa (1918–1921)
 First African-American quarterback to become a regular starter for a professional football team: Bernie Custis (Hamilton Tiger-Cats)

1952 
 First African-American driver in NASCAR: Wendell Scott (See also: 2015)
 First African-American woman elected to a U.S. state senate: Cora Brown (Michigan)
 First African-American U.S. Marine Corps aviator: Frank E. Petersen
 First African-American woman to be nominated for a national political office: Charlotta Bass, Vice President (Progressive Party) (See also: 2000, 2020)
 First African-American baseball player to appear in or win a College World Series: Don Eaddy

1953 
 First African-American basketball player to play in the NBA All-Star Game: Don Barksdale in the 1953 NBA All-Star Game
 First African-American quarterback to play in the National Football League during the modern (post-World War II) era: Willie Thrower (Chicago Bears)

1954 
 First African-American U.S. Navy Diver: Carl Brashear
 First individual African-American woman as subject on the cover of Life magazine: Dorothy Dandridge, November 1, 1954
 First African-American page for the U.S. Supreme Court, and first to be enrolled in the Capitol Page School: Charles V. Bush

1955 
 First African-American member of the Metropolitan Opera: Marian Anderson
 First African-American male dancer in a major ballet company: Arthur Mitchell (New York City Ballet); also first African-American principal dancer of a major ballet company (NYCB), 1956. (See also: 1969)
 First African-American pilot of a scheduled US airline: August Martin (cargo airline Seaboard & Western Airlines) (See also: 1964)
 First African-American to serve as a presidential executive assistant: E. Frederic Morrow, appointed by President Eisenhower as Administrative Officer for Special Projects.

1956 
 First African-American star of a nationwide network TV show: Nat King Cole of The Nat King Cole Show, NBC (See also: 1948)
 First African-American to break the color barrier in a bowl game in the Deep South: Bobby Grier (Pittsburgh Panthers in the 1956 Sugar Bowl)
 First African-American Wimbledon tennis champion: Althea Gibson (doubles, with Englishwoman Angela Buxton); also first African-American to win a Grand Slam event (French Open). 
 First African-American U.S. Secret Service agent: Charles Gittens
 First African-American to win the Cy Young Award as the top pitcher in Major League Baseball, in the award's inaugural year: Don Newcombe (Brooklyn Dodgers)
 First African-American woman to become president of a four-year, fully accredited liberal arts college: Willa Beatrice Player (Bennett College)

1957 
 First African-American female Wimbledon Tennis Champion: Althea Gibson
 First African-American assistant coach in the NFL: Lowell W. Perry (See also: 1966)
 First African-American to win Major League Baseball's Gold Glove, in the award's inaugural year: Willie Mays (New York Giants)
 First African-American to work as a botanist at the United States National Arboretum: Roland Jefferson

1958 
 First African-American flight attendant: Ruth Carol Taylor (Mohawk Airlines)
First African-American to reach number-one on the Billboard Hot 100: Tommy Edwards ("It's All in the Game")

1959 
 First African-American Grammy Award winners, in the award's inaugural year: Ella Fitzgerald and Count Basie (two awards each)
 First African-American television journalist: Louis Lomax
 First African-American to win a major national player of the year award in college basketball: Oscar Robertson, USBWA Player of the Year (in that award's inaugural year)

1960s 

 First African-American to win the Heisman Trophy: Ernie Davis
 First African-American to serve on a U.S. district court: James Benton Parsons, appointed to the U.S. District Court for the Northern District of Illinois
 First African-American delegate to the North Atlantic Treaty Organization: Edith S. Sampson (See also: 1950)
 First African-American to go over Niagara Falls: Nathan Boya a.k.a. William FitzGerald
 First African-American to join the PGA Tour: Charlie Sifford

1962 
 First African-American to be inducted into the Baseball Hall of Fame: Jackie Robinson (See also: Satchel Paige, 1971)
 First African-American coach in Major League Baseball: John Jordan "Buck" O'Neil (Chicago Cubs)
 First African-American attorney general of a state: Edward Brooke (Massachusetts) (See also: 1966)
 First African-American student admitted to the University of Mississippi: James Meredith

1963 
 First African-American bank examiner for the United States Department of the Treasury: Roland Burris
 First African-American to graduate from the University of Mississippi: James Meredith
 First African-American named as Time magazine's Man of the Year: Martin Luther King Jr.
 First African-American to win a NASCAR Grand National event: Wendell Scott
 First African-American police officer of the NYPD to be named a precinct commander: Lloyd Sealy, commander of the NYPD's 28th Precinct in Harlem.
 First African-American to be named American League MVP: Elston Howard (New York Yankees) (See also: Jackie Robinson, 1949)
 First African-American chess master: Walter Harris
 First African-American to appear as a series regular on a primetime dramatic television series: Cicely Tyson, "East Side/West Side" (CBS). 
 First African-American to be nominated for a Primetime Emmy Award: Diahann Carroll, for Outstanding Single Performance by an Actress in a Lead Role, for the episode "A Horse Has a Big Head, Let Him Worry" of Naked City (See also: 1968)
 First African-Americans inducted to the Basketball Hall of Fame: New York Renaissance, inducted as a team. (See also: Bob Douglas, 1972; Bill Russell, 1975; Clarence Gaines, 1982)
 First African-American to graduate from the U.S. Air Force Academy: Charles V. Bush.

1964 
 First African-American to join the Ladies Professional Golf Association: Althea Gibson
 First African-American pilot for a major commercial airline: David E. Harris, American Airlines (See also: 1955 and Marlon Green)
 First movie with African-American interracial marriage: One Potato, Two Potato, actors Bernie Hamilton and Barbara Barrie, written by Orville H. Hampton, Raphael Hayes, directed by Larry Peerce
 First African-American baseball player to be named the Major League Baseball World Series MVP: Bob Gibson, St. Louis Cardinals
 First African-American to graduate from the University of San Francisco: Dr. Mary Edna Davidson

1965 
 First African-American nationally syndicated cartoonist: Morrie Turner (Wee Pals)
 First African-American title character of a comic book series: Lobo (Dell Comics). (See also: The Falcon, 1969, and Luke Cage, 1972)
 First African-American star of a network television drama: Bill Cosby, I Spy (co-star with Robert Culp)
 First African-American cast member of a daytime soap opera: Micki Grant who played Peggy Nolan Harris on Another World until 1972.
 First African-American Playboy Playmate centerfold: Jennifer Jackson (March issue)
 First African-American U.S. Air Force General: Benjamin Oliver Davis Jr. (Three-star General)
 First African-American woman Ambassador of the United States: Patricia Roberts Harris, ambassador to Luxembourg
 First African-American NFL official: Burl Toler, field judge/head linesman
 First African-American to win a national chess championship: Frank Street Jr. (U.S. Amateur Championship)
 First African-American United States Solicitor General: Thurgood Marshall (See also: 1967)

1966 
 First African-American man to be nominated for a Primetime Emmy Award and first African-American to win a Primetime Emmy Award: Bill Cosby, I Spy
 First team with five African-American starters to win the NCAA basketball tournament: 1965–66 Texas Western Miners basketball team
 First African-American coach in the National Basketball Association: Bill Russell (Boston Celtics)
 First African-American (mixed-race) model on the cover of a Vogue (British Vogue) magazine: Donyale Luna
 First post-Reconstruction African-American elected to the U.S. Senate (and first African-American elected to the U.S. Senate by popular vote): Edward Brooke (Republican; Massachusetts) (See also: 1962)
 First African-American Cabinet secretary: Robert C. Weaver (Department of Housing and Urban Development)
 First African-American Major League Baseball umpire: Emmett Ashford
 First African-American NFL broadcaster: Lowell W. Perry (CBS, on Pittsburgh Steelers games) (See also: 1957)
 First African-American fire commissioner of a major U.S. city: Robert O. Lowery of the New York City Fire Department
 First African-American mayor in Ohio: Robert C. Henry of Springfield, Ohio.

1967 
 First African-American to win a PGA Tour event: Charlie Sifford (1967 Greater Hartford Open Invitational)
 First African-American elected mayor of a large U.S. city: Carl B. Stokes (Cleveland, Ohio)
 First African-American appointed to the Supreme Court of the United States: Thurgood Marshall (See also: 1965)
 First African-American selected for astronaut training: Robert Henry Lawrence Jr.
 First African-American to be inducted into the Pro Football Hall of Fame: Emlen Tunnell
 First African-American interracial kiss on network television: entertainers Nancy Sinatra (Italian-American) and Sammy Davis Jr. (African-American) on Sinatra's variety special Movin' With Nancy, airing December 11 on NBC (See also: 1968)

1968 
 First African-American interracial kiss on a network television drama: Uhura, played by Nichelle Nichols (African-American) and Captain Kirk, played by William Shatner (Jewish-Canadian): Star Trek: "Plato's Stepchildren" (See also: 1967)
 First African-American man to win a Grand Slam tennis event: Arthur Ashe (US Open) (See also: Althea Gibson, 1956; Serena Williams, 2003)
 First African-American coach to win an NBA Championship: Bill Russell
 First African-American woman elected to U.S. House of Representatives: Shirley Chisholm (New York)
 First African-American appointed as a United States Assistant Secretary of State: Barbara M. Watson
 First African-American to start at quarterback in the modern era of professional football: Marlin Briscoe (Denver Broncos, AFL)
 First African-American commissioned officer awarded the Medal of Honor: Riley L. Pitts
 First fine-arts museum devoted to African-American work: Studio Museum in Harlem
 First African-American actress to star in her own television series where she did not play a domestic worker: Diahann Carroll in Julia (see also: 1963)
 First African-American woman as a presidential candidate: Charlene Mitchell (See also: Shirley Chisholm, 1972)
 First African-American woman reporter for The New York Times: Nancy Hicks Maynard
 First African-American starring character of a comic strip: Danny Raven in Dateline: Danger! by Al McWilliams and John Saunders.

1969 
 First African-American superhero: The Falcon, Marvel Comics' Captain America #117 (September 1969). (See also: Lobo, 1965 and Luke Cage, 1972)
 First African-American graduate of Harvard Business School: Lillian Lincoln
 First African-American director of a major Hollywood motion picture: Gordon Parks (The Learning Tree)
 First African-American founder of a classical training school and the company of ballet: Arthur Mitchell, Dance Theatre of Harlem (See also: 1955)
 First African-American woman to appear on the Grand Ole Opry: Linda Martell
 First African-American to own a commercial airliner: Warren Wheeler (Wheeler Airlines)

1970s

1970 
 First African-American to head an Episcopal diocese: John Melville Burgess, diocesan bishop of Massachusetts
 First African-American U.S. Navy Master Diver: Carl Brashear (See also: 1954; 1968)
 First African-American member of the New York Stock Exchange: Joseph L. Searles III
 First African-American NCAA Division I basketball coach: Will Robinson (Illinois State University)
 First African-American contestant in the Miss America pageant: Cheryl Browne (Miss Iowa)
 First African-American woman (and first woman) to become a physician's assistant: Joyce Nichols
 First African-American actress to win a Emmy Award: Gail Fisher for Mannix (see also: 1971)
 First African-American basketball player to win the NBA All-Star MVP, the NBA Finals MVP, and the NBA MVP all in the same season: Willis Reed (New York Knicks)
 First African-American to initiate the concept of free agency. He refused to accept a trade following the 1969 season, ultimately appealing his case to the U.S. Supreme Court. The trend of free agency expanded across the entire landscape of professional sports for all races and all cultures: Curt Flood (St. Louis Cardinals)
 First African-American to become director of a major library system in America: Clara Stanton Jones, as director of the Detroit Public Library
 First African-American to perform at a Super Bowl halftime show: Lionel Hampton (Super Bowl IV)

1971 
 First African-American pitcher to be inducted into the Baseball Hall of Fame: Satchel Paige (See also: Jackie Robinson, 1962)
 First African-American president of the New York City Board of Education: Isaiah Edward Robinson Jr.
 First African-American to win a Golden Globe Award: Gail Fisher for Mannix (see also: 1970)
 First African-American female jockey in the United States: Cheryl White
 First African-American to appear by herself on the cover of Playboy: Darine Stern (October issue)
 First African-American to become president of the Public Library Association: Effie Lee Morris

1972 
 First African-American to campaign for the U.S. presidency in a major political party and to win a U.S. presidential primary/caucus: Shirley Chisholm (Democratic Party, New Jersey primary) (See also: 1968)
 First African-American superhero to star in own comic-book series: Luke Cage, Marvel Comics' Luke Cage, Hero for Hire #1 (June 1972). (See also: Lobo, 1965, and the Falcon, 1969)
 First African-American National Basketball Association general manager: Wayne Embry
 First African-American interracial romantic kiss in a mainstream comics magazine: "The Men Who Called Him Monster", by writer Don McGregor (See also: 1975) and artist Luis Garcia, in Warren Publishing's black-and-white horror-comics magazine Creepy #43 (Jan. 1972) (See also: 1975)
 First African-American interracial male kiss on network television: Sammy Davis Jr. (mixed-race) and Carroll O'Connor (Caucasian) in All in the Family
 First African-American inducted to the Basketball Hall of Fame: Team-owner and coach Bob Douglas, in the category of "contributor" (See also: New York Renaissance, 1963; player Bill Russell, 1975; coach Clarence Gaines, 1982)
 First African-American female Broadway director: Vinnette Justine Carroll (Don't Bother Me, I Can't Cope)
 First African-American comic-book creator to receive a "created by" cover-credit: Wayne Howard (Midnight Tales #1)

1973 
 First African-American artistic director of a professional regional theater: Harold Scott (Cincinnati Playhouse in the Park)
 First African-American Bond villain in a James Bond movie: Yaphet Kotto, playing Mr. Big/Dr. Kananga, Live and Let Die.
 First African-American Bond Girl in a James Bond movie: Gloria Hendry (playing Rosie Carver), Live and Let Die.
 First African-American elected mayor of Los Angeles: Tom Bradley
 First African-American psychologist in the U.S. Air Force: John D. Robinson
 First African-American woman mayor of a U.S. metropolitan city: Doris A. Davis, Compton, California
 First African-American woman adult film star, Desiree West.

1974 
 First African-American model on the cover of U.S. Vogue magazine: Beverly Johnson
 First African-American NBA Coach of the Year: Ray Scott (Detroit Pistons)
 First African-American woman to serve as a United States Secret Service agent: Zandra Flemister

1975 
 First African-American elected mayor, and first mayor, of Washington, D.C.: Walter Washington
 First African-American game show host: Adam Wade (CBS' Musical Chairs)
 First African-American four-star general: Daniel James Jr.
 First African-American inducted to the Basketball Hall of Fame as a player: Bill Russell (See also: New York Renaissance, 1963; Bob Douglas, 1972; Clarence Gaines, 1982)
 First African-American interracial couple in a TV-show cast: The Jeffersons, actors Franklin Cover (Caucasian) and Roxie Roker (African-American) as Tom and Helen Willis, respectively; the show's creator: Norman Lear
 First African-American interracial romantic kiss in a full-color comic book: Amazing Adventures #31 (July 1975), feature "Killraven: Warrior of the Worlds", characters M'Shulla Scott and Carmilla Frost, by writer Don McGregor and artist P. Craig Russell (See also: 1972)
 First African-American manager in Major League Baseball: Frank Robinson (Cleveland Indians)
 First African-American model on the cover of Elle magazine: Beverly Johnson
 First African-American psychologist in the U.S. Navy: John D. Robinson
 First African-American to play in a men's major golf championship: Lee Elder (The Masters)
 First African-American to be named Super Bowl MVP in NFL: Franco Harris (Pittsburgh Steelers). Of mixed ancestry, Harris was also the first Italian-American to win the award.
 First African-American women named as Time magazine's Person of the Year: Barbara Jordan and Addie L. Wyatt

1976 
 First African-American female elected officer of an international labor union: Addie L. Wyatt
 First African-American to become president of the American Library Association: Clara Stanton Jones, who served as its acting president from April 11 to July 22 in 1976 and then its president from July 22, 1976 to 1977
 First African-American to win a major party nomination for statewide office in the Southern United States since the Reconstruction era: Asa T. Spaulding Jr.

1977 
 First African-American (and first woman), appointed director of the Peace Corps: Carolyn R. Payton
 First African-American drafted to play professional basketball, first woman to dunk in a professional women's game: Cardte Hicks
 First African-American woman in the U.S. Cabinet: Patricia Roberts Harris, Secretary of Housing and Urban Development
 First African-American woman whose signature appeared on U.S. currency: Azie Taylor Morton, the 36th Treasurer of the United States
 First African-American publisher of mainstream gay publication: Alan Bell (Gaysweek)
 First African-American woman to join the Daughters of the American Revolution: Karen Batchelor
 First African-American Major League Baseball general manager: Bill Lucas (Atlanta Braves)
 First African-American woman to be ordained as an Episcopal priest: Pauli Murray.
First African-American (half-Latin) woman to work as a registrar for a major scientific museum: Margaret Santiago.

1978 
 First African-American broadcast network news anchor: Max Robinson
 First African-American woman pilot for a major commercial airline: Jill E. Brown, Texas International Airlines
 First African-American woman to advance to the rank of captain in the Navy: Joan C. Bynum

1979 
 First African-American U.S. Marine Corps general officer: Frank E. Petersen
 First African-American to win a Daytime Emmy Award for lead actor in a soap opera: Al Freeman Jr. (Ed Hall in One Life to Live)
 First African-American woman ordained in the Lutheran Church in America (LCA), the largest of three denominations that later combined to form the Evangelical Lutheran Church in America: Earlean Miller
 First African-American head coach of an NCAA Division I-A football program: Willie Jeffries (Wichita State).

1980s

1980 
 First African-American woman to graduate from (and to attend) the U.S. Naval Academy: Janie L. Mines, graduated in 1980
 First African-American woman to join the cast of NBC's Saturday Night Live: Yvonne Hudson
 First African-American-oriented cable television network: BET

1981 
 First African-American to play in the NHL: Val James (Buffalo Sabres)

1982 
 First African-American inducted to the Basketball Hall of Fame as a coach: Clarence Gaines (See also: New York Renaissance, 1963; Bob Douglas, 1972; Bill Russell, 1975)
 First African-American U.S. Army four-star General: Roscoe Robinson Jr.

1983 
 First African-American astronaut: Guion Bluford (Challenger mission STS-8).
 First African-American mayor of Chicago: Harold Washington
 First African-American Miss America: Vanessa L. Williams (A few weeks before the end of her reign as Miss America, Williams learned that Penthouse magazine would be publishing unauthorized nude photographs of her in an upcoming issue. Amid growing media controversy and scrutiny, Williams resigned as Miss America in July 1984 (under pressure from the Miss America Organization) and was replaced by first runner-up Miss New Jersey Suzette Charles, who was also African-American.)
 First African-American owners of a major metropolitan newspaper: Robert C. and Nancy Hicks Maynard (Oakland Tribune)
 First African-American artist to have a music video shown on MTV: Michael Jackson

1984 
 First African-American to win a delegate-awarding U.S. presidential primary/caucus: Jesse Jackson (Louisiana, the District of Columbia, South Carolina, Virginia, and one of two separate Mississippi contests).
 First African-American New York City Police Commissioner: Benjamin Ward
 First African-American coach to win the NCAA Men's Division I Basketball Championship: John Thompson (Georgetown)

1985 
 First African-American to become a member of the U.S. Navy's Blue Angels precision flying team: Donnie Cochran. Also first African-American to command the team (1994).
 First African-American (mixed-race) female general: Sherian Cadoria

1986 
 First African-American Formula One racecar driver: Willy T. Ribbs (See also: Ribbs, 1991)
 First African-American musicians inducted into the Rock and Roll Hall of Fame, in the inaugural class: Chuck Berry, James Brown, Ray Charles, Sam Cooke, Fats Domino, and Little Richard
 First African-American woman (Shirley A. Ajayi) was given a part for 6 months on a TV show as a psychic in 1986 in Chicago, Illinois. Shirley had to audition with other psychics to get the part. She then was taught marketing at the John Hancock center by her boss who ran the TV show. For safety reasons she was renamed as "Aura!". Bio available-book: "Aura The Ebony Princess."

1987 
First African-American woman, and first woman, inducted into the Rock and Roll Hall of Fame: Aretha Franklin
 First African-American Radio City Music Hall Rockette: Jennifer Jones
 First African-American man to sail around the world solo: Teddy Seymour

1988 
 First African-American to win a medal at the Winter Olympics (a bronze in figure skating): Debi Thomas
 First African-American woman elected to a U.S. judgeship, and first appointed to a state supreme court: Juanita Kidd Stout
 First African-American candidate for President of the United States to obtain ballot access in all 50 states: Lenora Fulani
 First African-American NFL referee: Johnny Grier
 First African-American quarterback to start (and to win) a Super Bowl: Doug Williams (Super Bowl XXII)

1989 
 First African-American NFL coach of the modern era: Art Shell, Los Angeles Raiders
 First African-American mayor of New York City: David Dinkins
 First African-American Chairman of the Joint Chiefs of Staff: Colin Powell
 First African-American woman (and first woman), ordained bishop in the Episcopal Church: Barbara Clementine Harris
 First African-American Chairman of the Democratic National Committee: Ron Brown

1990s

1990 
 First elected African-American governor: Douglas Wilder (Virginia) (See also: P. B. S. Pinchback, 1872)
 First African-American elected president of the Harvard Law Review: Barack Obama (See also: 2008, 2009)
 First African-American Miss USA: Carole Gist
 First African-American Playboy Playmate of the Year: Renee Tenison

1991 
 First African-American to qualify for the Indianapolis 500 auto race: Willy T. Ribbs (See also: Ribbs, 1986)
 First African-American female mayor of Washington, D.C.: Sharon Pratt Kelly

1992 
 First African-American female astronaut: Dr. Mae Jemison (Space Shuttle Endeavour)
 First African-American woman elected to U.S. Senate: Carol Moseley Braun (Illinois)
 First African-American woman to moderate a Presidential debate: Carole Simpson (second debate of 1992 campaign)
 First African-American to sail solo around the world following the Age of Sail route around the southern tips of South America (Cape Horn) and Africa (Cape of Good Hope), avoiding the Panama and Suez Canals: Bill Pinkney
 First African-American Major League Baseball manager to reach (and win) the World Series: Cito Gaston (Toronto Blue Jays) 1992 World Series
 First African-American to direct an animated film: Bruce W. Smith (Bébé's Kids)

1993 
 First African-American United States Secretary of Commerce: Ron Brown
 First African-American woman (and first woman), appointed as U.S. Secretary of Energy: Hazel R. O'Leary
 First African-American to win the Nobel Prize for Literature: Toni Morrison
 First African-American woman named Poet Laureate of the United States: Rita Dove; also the youngest person named to that position
 First African-American appointed Director of the National Drug Control Policy: Lee P. Brown
 First African-American Director of the Centers for Disease Control and Prevention: David Satcher
 First African-American appointed Surgeon General of the United States: Joycelyn Elders
 First African-American to serve as home plate umpire for World Series game: Charlie Williams for Game 4 of the 1993 World Series
 First African-American to be inducted as a member of the Grand Ole Opry: Charley Pride

1994 
 First African-American female director of a major-studio movie: Darnell Martin (Columbia Pictures' I Like It Like That)
 First African-American (mixed-race) to win the United States Amateur Championship: Tiger Woods

1995 
 First African-American inductee to the National Radio Hall of Fame: Hal Jackson
 First African-American Sergeant Major of the Army: Gene C. McKinney
 First African-American Miss Universe: Chelsi Smith
 First African-American personal diarist to a U.S. president (Bill Clinton): Janis F. Kearney

1996 
 First African-American U.S. Navy four-star admiral: J. Paul Reason
 First African-American MLB general manager to win the World Series: Bob Watson (New York Yankees), 1996 World Series

1997 
 First African-American (mixed-race) to win a men's major golf championship: Tiger Woods (The Masters)
 First African-American model to appear on the cover of Sports Illustrated Swimsuit Edition: Tyra Banks
 First African-American UFC champion: Maurice Smith
 First African-American Director of the National Park Service: Robert Stanton

1998 
 First African-American appointed U.S. Secretary of Labor: Alexis Herman
 First African-American female rear admiral in the U.S. Navy: Lillian Fishburne
 First African-American Master Chief Petty Officer of the Coast Guard: Vincent W. Patton III
 First African-American (mixed-race) to play in the Presidents Cup: Tiger Woods
 First African-American to lie in honor at the U.S. Capitol: Jacob Chestnut (See also: 2005, 2019)

1999 
 First African-American to be awarded the Grandmaster title in chess: Maurice Ashley
 First African-American Sergeant Major of the Marine Corps: Alford L. McMichael
 First African-American CEO of a Fortune 500 company: Franklin Raines of Fannie Mae
 First African-American female university president: Shirley Ann Jackson at Rensselaer Polytechnic Institute

21st century

2000s

2000 
 First African-American nominated for Vice President of the United States by a Federal Election Commission-recognized and federally funded political party: Ezola B. Foster (See also: 1952, 2020; FEC established in 1975)
 First African-American to be inducted into the Country Music Hall of Fame: Charley Pride

2001 

 First African-American (mixed-race) Secretary of State: Colin Powell
 First African-American president of the United States Conference of Catholic Bishops: The Most Reverend Wilton Daniel Gregory
 First African-American president of the Unitarian Universalist Association: Rev. William G. Sinkford
 First African-American president of an Ivy League university: Ruth J. Simmons at Brown University
 First African-American woman National Security Advisor: Condoleezza Rice (See also: 2005)
 First African-American billionaire: Robert L. Johnson, founder of Black Entertainment Television (See also: 2002)
 First African-American woman billionaire: Sheila Johnson

2002 
 First African-American to become majority owner of a U.S. major sports league team: Robert L. Johnson (Charlotte Bobcats, NBA) (See also: 2001)
 First African-American Winter Olympic gold medal winner: Vonetta Flowers (two-woman bobsleigh)
 First African-American woman combat pilot in the U.S. Armed Forces: Captain Vernice Armour, USMC (See also: 2008)
 First African-American (half-Caucasian) to win an Oscar: Halle Berry (Best Lead Actress, Monster's Ball, 2001)
 First African-American woman to be ranked #1 in tennis: Venus Williams
 First African-American to be named year-end world champion by the International Tennis Federation: Serena Williams
 First African-American Arena Football League head coach to win ArenaBowl: Darren Arbet (San Jose SaberCats), ArenaBowl XVI
 First African-American general manager in the National Football League: Ozzie Newsome (Baltimore Ravens)

2003 
 First African-American to win a Career Grand Slam in tennis: Serena Williams (See also: Althea Gibson, 1956; Arthur Ashe, 1968)
 First African-American American Bar Association president: Dennis Archer

2004 
 First African-American inducted into the World Golf Hall of Fame: Charlie Sifford
 First African-American NBA general manager to win the NBA Finals: Joe Dumars (Detroit Pistons), 2004 NBA Finals
 First African-American Canadian Football League head coach to reach (and win) the Grey Cup: Pinball Clemons (Toronto Argonauts), 92nd Grey Cup

2005 
 First African-American woman Secretary of State: Condoleezza Rice (See also: 2001)
First African-American women to lead a major transportation agency in the U.S. serving on the BART Board of Directors: Carole Ward Allen and Lynette Sweet
 First African-American woman U.S. Coast Guard aviator: Jeanine Menze
 First African-American woman (and first woman), to lie in honor at the U.S. Capitol: Rosa Parks (See also: 1998, 2019)

2006 
 First African-American to command a United States Marine Corps division: Major General Walter E. Gaskin
 First African-American individual Winter Olympic gold medal winner: Shani Davis (men's 1,000-meter speed skating) 
 First African-American to reach the peak of Mount Everest: Sophia Danenberg
 First African-American woman to receive Dharma transmission in Zen Buddhism: Merle Kodo Boyd
 First African-American quarterback inducted into the Pro Football Hall of Fame: Warren Moon
 First African-American Lady of Turks and Caicos Islands: LisaRaye McCoy

2007 
 First known African-American woman to reach the North Pole: Barbara Hillary
 First African-American White House Chief Usher: Stephen Rochon
First African-American NFL head coaches to reach the Super Bowl: Lovie Smith and Tony Dungy, Super Bowl XLI
 First African-American NFL coach to win a Super Bowl: Tony Dungy (Super Bowl XLI)

2008 
 First African-American to be nominated as a major-party U.S. presidential candidate: Barack Obama, Democratic Party
 First African-American elected President of the United States: Barack Obama
 First African-American to referee a Super Bowl game: Mike Carey (Super Bowl XLII)
 First African-American woman elected Speaker of a state House of Representatives: California Rep. Karen Bass
 First African-American to be appointed to the United States Senate by a state governor: Roland Burris
 First African-American woman combat pilot in the United States Air Force: Major Shawna Rochelle Kimbrell (See also: 2002)
 First African-American NFL general manager to win the Super Bowl: Jerry Reese (New York Giants), Super Bowl XLII

2009 

 First African-American {mixed race) President of the United States: Barack Obama
 First African-American First Lady of the United States: Michelle Obama
 First African-American chair of the Republican National Committee: Michael Steele
 First African-American United States Attorney General: Eric Holder
 First African-American woman United States Ambassador to the United Nations: Susan Rice
 First African-American United States Trade Representative: Ron Kirk
 First African-American woman Administrator of the Environmental Protection Agency: Lisa P. Jackson
 First African-American White House Social Secretary: Desirée Rogers
 First African-American to appear by himself on a circulating U.S. coin: Duke Ellington (District of Columbia quarter).
 First African-American Administrator of the National Aeronautics and Space Administration: Charles F. Bolden Jr.
 First African-American woman rabbi: Alysa Stanton
 First African-American woman CEO of a Fortune 500 company: Ursula Burns, Xerox Corporation.
 First African-American doubles team to be named year-end world champion by the International Tennis Federation: Serena and Venus Williams

2010s

2010 
 First African-American female to be elected state Attorney General in the United States: Kamala Harris (California) (See also: 2020 and 2021)
 First African-American to win the Stanley Cup: Dustin Byfuglien with the Chicago Blackhawks

2011 
 First African-American Director of the Federal Bureau of Prisons: Charles E. Samuels Jr.
 First African-American admitted to the Reconstructionist Rabbinical College: Sandra Lawson

2012 
 First African-American to be re-elected President of the United States: Barack Obama
 First African-American Combatant Commander of United States Central Command: Lloyd Austin
 First African-American elected president of the Southern Baptist Convention (SBC): Fred Luter
 First African-American woman to take command of a navy missile destroyer: Monika Washington Stoker

2013 
 First African-American U.S. senator from the former Confederacy since Reconstruction: Tim Scott
 First African-American president of the Academy of Motion Picture Arts and Sciences: Cheryl Boone Isaacs
 First African-American United States Secretary of Homeland Security: Jeh Johnson

2014 
 First African-American woman four-star admiral: Michelle J. Howard
 First African-American senator to be elected in the South since Reconstruction: Tim Scott, elected in South Carolina
 First African-American player named to the USA Curtis Cup Team: Mariah Stackhouse

2015 
 First African-American to lead a major intelligence agency: Vincent R. Stewart, Defense Intelligence Agency
 First African-American commissioner of a major North American sports league: Jeffrey Orridge, Canadian Football League
 First African-American woman Attorney General of the United States: Loretta Lynch
 First African-American female principal dancer for the American Ballet Theatre: Misty Copeland
 First African-American to be inducted into the NASCAR Hall of Fame: Wendell Scott (See also: 1952)
 First African-American sole anchor of a network evening newscast: Lester Holt
 First African-American elected as presiding bishop of the Episcopal Church: Bishop Michael Curry
 First African-American female American Bar Association president: Paulette Brown

2016 
 First African-American president of a major broadcast TV network: Channing Dungey
 First African-American Librarian of Congress: Dr. Carla Hayden

2017
 First African-American CEO of a Major League Baseball team: Derek Jeter

2018 
 First African-American woman to headline Coachella: Beyoncé, giving rise to the nickname Beychella
 First African-American to play for Team USA Hockey in the Olympic Games: Jordan Greenway
 First African-American artist commissioned for U.S. president portrait to be displayed in the Smithsonian: Kehinde Wiley
 First African-American artist commissioned for U.S. first lady portrait to be displayed in the Smithsonian: Amy Sherald
 First African-American to be the artistic or creative director of a French fashion house: Virgil Abloh
 First African-American president of the American Psychiatric Association: Altha Stewart
 First African-American woman to be major party nominee for state governor: Stacey Abrams
 First African-American superintendent of the United States Military Academy: Darryl A. Williams
 First African-American woman U.S. Marine Corps general officer: Lorna Mahlock

2019 
 First African-American woman to be the director of the Illinois Department of Public Health: Dr. Ngozi Ezike
 First African-American general authority of the Church of Jesus Christ of Latter-day Saints: Peter M. Johnson
 First African-American (and first historian) secretary of the Smithsonian Institution: Lonnie Bunch
 First African-American female director of an Association of Zoos and Aquariums-accredited institution: Denise Verret
 First African-American elected official to lie in state at the U.S. Capitol: Representative Elijah Cummings (See also: 1998, 2005)

2020s

2020 

 First African-American to be nominated as a major party U.S. vice-presidential candidate: Kamala Harris, Democratic Party (See also: 2010 and 2021)
First African-American and first female elected Vice President of the United States: Kamala Harris
 First African-American to be appointed as a military Chief of Staff and first African-American to lead any branch of the United States Armed Forces: Charles Q. Brown Jr.
 First African-American president of an NFL team: Jason Wright (Washington Commanders)
 First African-American Professor of Poetry, first African-American woman Professor and first Distinguished Visiting Poetry Professor of the Iowa Writers' Workshop: Tracie Morris
 First African-American elected official to lie in state at the U.S. Capitol Rotunda: John Lewis (See also: 1998, 2005)
 First African-American Catholic cardinal: Wilton Gregory

2021 
First African-American and first female Vice President of the United States: Kamala Harris (See also: 2010 and 2020)
First African-American and first female President of the United States Senate: Kamala Harris
First African-American and first female to serve as Acting President of the United States: Kamala Harris
First African-American Democratic U.S. senator to represent a former Confederate state in the United States Senate: Raphael Warnock, elected in Georgia.
First African-American United States Secretary of Defense: Lloyd Austin
 First full-time female African-American NFL coach: Jennifer King (Washington Commanders).
 First African-American president of the American Civil Liberties Union: Deborah Archer
 First African-American woman to serve on the Supreme Court of Missouri: Robin Ransom
First African-American woman to appear on the Maxim magazine and became "Sexiest Woman Alive": Teyana Taylor
 First African-American to win the Scripps National Spelling Bee: Zaila Avant-garde
 First African-American U.S. Attorney for the Southern District of New York: Damian Williams
 First African-American NCAA ice hockey coach: Kelsey Koelzer 
 First African-American Connecticut State Comptroller: Natalie Braswell                              
 First African-American woman to be elected as Lieutenant Governor of Virginia: Winsome Sears

2022 
 First African-American woman and first woman to be the police commissioner of the New York Police Department: Keechant Sewell
 First African-American woman to appear on U.S. currency (a quarter): Maya Angelou
 First African-American woman nominated, confirmed to, and sworn into the Supreme Court of the United States: Ketanji Brown Jackson
 First African-American represented in the National Statuary Hall Collection: Mary McLeod Bethune
 First African-American Marine Corps four-star general: Michael Langley
 First African-American governor-elect of the U.S. state of Maryland: Wes Moore
 First African-American Attorney General-elect of the U.S. state of Maryland: Anthony Brown
 First African-American chosen to lead a party caucus in either chamber of Congress: Hakeem Jeffries (D-NY)
 First African-American female Major general in the United States Marine Corps: Lorna Mahlock

See also 
 List of African-American pioneers in desegregation of higher education
 List of African-American sports firsts
 List of African-American arts firsts
 List of African-American United States Cabinet members
 List of African-American U.S. state firsts
 List of black Academy Award winners and nominees
 List of black Golden Globe Award winners and nominees
 List of first African-American mayors
 List of African-American women in medicine
 Timeline of African-American history
 Timeline of the civil rights movement
 List of Asian-American firsts
 List of Native American firsts

Notes

References

Footnotes

Bibliography

External links 
 
 
 
 
  – Interviews with six African-American "firsts", including the first black governor, the first black billionaire, and the first black Ivy League president.
 

African-American
African-American firsts
Social history of the United States
American culture
United States history timelines